Hoar Oak Water is a moorland tributary of the East Lyn River in Exmoor, Somerset, England.

It rises at Hoaroak Hill in the Chains geological site and flows to Watersmeet in the East Lyn Valley in Devon.

References

Exmoor
Rivers of Somerset